Ajijesh Pachat is a Malayalam novelist, short story writer and columnist from Malappuram, Kerala, India.

Career 
Ajijesh Pachat was born as the son of Krishnan and Shobana in Pallikkal, Malappuram, Kerala.. His story Theevrashapam (The extreme curse) was published in the magazine Chandrika. In 2006, he won second place in short story contest conducted by Samakalika Malayalam weekly for his story To X-ray under 16. Pachat published his first collection of stories, Kisebi in 2016
. His Daivakkali (God's game), short stories collection, won the Geetha Hiranyan Endowment by Kerala Sahitya Akademi in 2017. His first novel Ezhampathippinte Adya Prathi ( The first copy of the seventh edition) was published in 2019. He has also wrote for The Indian Express, Madhyamam and Deshabhimani.

List of works

Collection of short stories 

 Kisebi
 Daivakkali
 Koovalkkinarugal
 Ponmoorcha
 Thakkolulla Kutti
 Radclifinte Katrika
 Pedippathipp
 Pashumathigal
 Castrolsavashesham
 Ma Enna Carnivalile Nayakanum Nayikayum
 Oru Rajesh Meshari Nirmithi
 Irachikkalappa
 Ara Manikkoor Dairgyam Ulla Chodyappeppar
 Koova
 Peda
 Paralux

Novels 

 Athirazhisootram
 Ezhampathippinte Adyaprathi

Memoir 

 Orankutti vangiya aarthavappoometha

Awards and honours 

 Kerala Sahitya Akademi Geetha Hiranyan Endowment
 Anganam TV Kochubava award
 PN Panicker Story Award
 Keli Short Story Award
Kalakaumudy - K. Sukumaran Story Award
M. P. Narayana Pillai Story Award
K. S Bimal Story Award
Chembil John Award

References 

Malayali people
Malayalam-language writers
Malayalam novelists
Malayalam short story writers
21st-century Indian novelists
Living people
21st-century Indian short story writers
Indian male short story writers
People from Malappuram district
Novelists from Kerala
Indian male novelists
21st-century Indian male writers
Year of birth missing (living people)